Leefdaal is a small town in central Belgium, in the Flemish Brabant. It is part of the municipality of Bertem. Before 1977 it used to be one of the biggest villages in the region. Leefdaal features two medieval churches and a 17th-century castle.

People of Leefdael 
Jean de Brouchoven, 2nd Count of Bergeyck, 1st Baron of Leefdael, buried in Leefdaal.
Hubertus, (656-727) In the year 727, a few days before his death, Hubertus stopped with his companions at Leefdael on his way from Heverlee where he had been preaching. He was seized with fever and then hurried to Tervuren.

Toponymy

Heritage
 Leefdaal Castle, residence of the House of Merode.

Gallery

References

Populated places in Flemish Brabant